The Ramensky family hoax was one of the most successful Russian hoaxes, concocted by Antonin Ramensky (1913–1985), a retired Soviet Komsomol and Communist Party activist, who presented himself to journalists as a bedridden and sometimes moribund invalid. He pursued the hoax since 1961 until his death and was not exposed until a year after it.

Antonin Ramensky belonged to a family of country teachers, issued from petty village clergymen. His great-uncle Alexei Ramensky (1845–1928) was a high-ranked education official of Imperial Russia, who reached the rank of Active State Councillor, or civil general. In early 1880s Alexei Ramensky briefly taught in the same school in Simbirsk where Vladimir Lenin studied. This fact prompted the younger Ramensky to invent a story of Lenin's autographs ostensibly hidden in the family, and he presented some of these in 1961 to the 22nd Congress of the Communist Party of the Soviet Union. This forgery, albeit ingenuous, was successful and first made him famous.

Ramensky invented several generations of his ancestors, all of them being teachers, and pretended to be a scion of the "Ramensky teachers' dynasty", within the Soviet-time conception of labour dynasties. In the earliest version of the legend, the dynasty dated back to the 1760s, and in 1963 a 200-year anniversary was celebrated. The Ramenskys were allegedly active in Mologino, Tver Oblast, and had founded the first school there. Ramensky also became the first person ever to forge autographs of Alexander Pushkin, recognized as genuine by the leading Pushkin scholars. According to the myth, Pushkin visited Mologino in 1829 and presented a book, the Russian translation of Walter Scott's Ivanhoe, with autographed verse and drawings, to the hoaxer's ancestor (who in fact never existed).

Later Ramensky updated his myth and expanded the claimed lifespan of the dynasty as early as to the fifteenth century. The legend came to include dozens of historical figures, writers, and revolutionaries, as well as many key episodes of Soviet propaganda. Some other forgeries fabricated by Ramensky were donated by him to different museums without much vocal doubt with regard to their authenticity.

The Ramensky hoax went international as well. In 1968, an article about "The House of Ramenskys" authored by the well-known Soviet pedagogue Simon Soloveychik was published in the English-language Soviet Life magazine. The forger had also invented numerous Bulgarian connections of the dynasty, claiming his surname to be of Bulgarian origin. After meeting Bulgarian journalists who supported his fabrications, Ramensky exchanged gifts with the Bulgarian leader Todor Zhivkov.

Shortly after Ramensky's death, the most extensive and ambitious version of the hoax was published in the Novy Mir magazine. It contained so many anachronisms and absurd claims that it was quickly debunked by experts in 1986. Nevertheless Ramensky's forgeries are still on display in the museum of Alexander Pushkin in Moscow, and are often quoted in regional media. A statue of the mythical ancestor was unveiled in 1986 in front of a school in Tver Oblast, and in 2000s the story made its way into the local heraldry.

References

Sources
 Рыбалка А. А. «Мы, Раменские»: такой добрый хороший миф… // Историческая экспертиза. — 2018. — № 3. — С. 214—231.
 Рыбалка А. А. Антонин Раменский: Ленинский след // Историческая экспертиза. — 2019. — № 2. — С. 158-171.
 Козлов В. П. Обманутая, но торжествующая Клио. Подлоги письменных источников по российской истории в XX веке. — М.: Российская политическая энциклопедия, 2001. — 224 с. 
 Краснобородько Т. И. История одной мистификации (Мнимые пушкинские записи на книге Вальтера Скотта «Айвенго») // Легенды и мифы о Пушкине. — СПб.: Академический проект, 1995. — С. 277—289.
 Маковеев М. С. Династия учителей Раменских. — М.: Советская Россия, 1963. — 47 с.
 Цявловская Т. Г. Новые автографы Пушкина на русском издании «Айвенго» Вальтера Скотта // Временник Пушкинской комиссии, 1963. — Л.: Наука, 1966. — С. 5—30.

Hoaxes in Russia
1960s hoaxes
Document forgeries